Parantaka Chola II (Tamil: இரண்டாம் பராந்தக சோழன்) (r. 958 – 973 CE) was a Chola emperor. He is also known as Sundara Chola as he was considered an epitome of male beauty. He was the son of Arinjaya Chola and queen Kalyani, a princess of Vaidumba family. Parantaka II ascended the Chola throne despite the fact that his cousin Madurantaka Uttama Chola, the son of Gandaraditya Chola(the elder brother of Arinjaya Chola) was alive and he had equal if not more claim to the Chola throne. During his reign, Parantaka Sundara Chola defeated the Pandyas and Ceylon and then recaptured the Tondaimandalam from Rashtrakutas.

When Parantaka II became king, the Chola kingdom had shrunk to the size of a small principality. The Pandyas in the south had revived their fortunes and had defeated the Chola armies and occupied their ancestral lands.

During Parantaka II's reign, the foundations were laid for the success of the Chola Empire a generation later. A few territories in the north were recovered. The Pandyan ruler Vira Pandya was defeated and Madurai was taken. An expedition was made to gain control of Sri Lanka but it was not successful.Parantaka II waged war against Rashtrakutas and successfully regained Tondaimandalam.

Early life 
According to the Anbil plates Arinjaya was succeeded by his son. After coming to power Sundara Chola aka Parantaka II first directed his attention to the south against Vira Pandya, who had repulsed Gandaraditya's attempt to restore Chola supremacy in the Pandya country.

Pandyan War 

Immediately after becoming king, Parantaka II's attention was directed towards the growing strength of the Pandyas in the south. Vira Pandya, having repulsed Gandaraditya's attempts to restore Chola supremacy in the Pandyan kingdom, was ruling as an independent potentate. The invading Chola army met the Pandyas at Chevur.

The Leyden copperplate inscriptions tell us in that war, "Parantaka II caused rivers of blood to flow". Other inscriptions mention that Parantaka and his young son, Aditya Karikalan (also referred to as Aditha II) defeated Vira Pandya and made him flee to the hills surrounding the battlefield. The young son Aditha, who took to the battlefield at the age of "twelve" and who was a "very abhimanyu" in valour, is profusely praised for having conducted himself in battlefield with as much ease as he was at "military training sessions".
 
It is also possible that Aditya Karikalan killed Vira Pandya in that battle. Aditha's inscriptions use the epithet "Vira Pandyan Thalai Konda Adithha Karikalan" - "...took the head of Vira Pandya". After the battle of Chevur, Parantaka II's armies continued their thrust into the Pandya country. The Pandya king had the Sinhalese king Mahinda IV as his ally and the Lankan troops supported the Pandya army in the battlefield c. 959 CE. Parantaka II's armies also invaded Lanka to neutralise this support. The especially wicked nature of this coalition is noted by chola panegyrists to be "wicked force of age of kali, that were duly uprooted by the king.". As a procedure for de-recognizing the rogue kingdoms Parantaka II also seized the royal insignia of pandyans like fish emblem, throne, gem studded crown and ancient pearl necklace.

Sundara Chola called himself Maduraikonda Rajakesari, that is the Royal Lion who took Madurai and Madhurantaka (destroyer of Madurai) in order to commemorate his victories over the Pandyas.

Although the Chola armies won the battle, the war was still not won. Parantaka II did not succeed in re-establishing the Chola power over the Pandya lands.

Success against Rashtrakutas (Recovery of Tondaimandalam) 

Parantaka II next concentrated in his war against Rashtrakutas. Some documents provide an interesting account of military acumen and gallantry exhibited during the war by a certain chola commander belonging to one of the 98 divisions of troop velaikkaras. The commander who is praised to be a devotee at feet of lord at thillai and who was "a very murugan at war", is credited to have on two occasions almost singlehandedly pulverized big battalions of the enemy thereby causing their defeat. This commander who is glorified in these deccan wars is at the instance of lord finally given up his uniform to become a saint at tirruvottriyur and take the name ottriyur atikalar there upon producing some very good works on saiva siddantam prior to attaining lord's beatitude.

Sri Lankan Expedition

Sundara Chola Parantaka also waged war against the Sinhala ruler in Sri Lanka. The expedition was led by his general and his relative the Irukkuvel chief Parantaka Siriyavelar. However this expedition did not end well for the Cholas as both Siriyavelar and the Chola King's brother in law, the Bana chief fell in battle.

Aditya II’s (Karikala's) Assassination 

Parantaka II's last days appear to have been clouded by a personal tragedy. The heir-apparent Aditya II was assassinated by a group of conspirators.

There are other theories, claiming that the Pandyan spies were involved in the death of Aditya II and he was assassinated to avenge the death of Veerapandiyan in the battle of Chevur. There are however no direct evidence to support this theory. One of the inscriptions found at Udayarkudi temple in Tamil Nadu of Rajaraja notes that the property of some persons were confiscated as punishment for their involvement in the plot.

Uttama’s ascension 

After the assassination of Aditya II, it seems that Uttama forced Parantaka II to make him the heir-apparent. Arulmozhivarman (or Rajaraja I), Parantaka II's second son did not protest, anxious to avoid a civil war. It was apparently part of the compromise that Uttama was to succeed the throne only if he accepted to be succeeded, not by his own children but by Arulmolivarman. The Thiruvalangadu copperplate inscription states that Madhurantaka Uttama Chola made Arulmoli the heir-apparent.

Parantaka II's death and legacy 

Parantaka II, heart broken by the personal tragedy died in Kanchipuram at his golden palace (c. 980 CE). He was thereafter known as "Pon maligai thunjina thevar" – "the king who died in the golden palace". Parantaka II continued the chola legacy of absolutely professional and democratic management. This is seen from many inscriptions of his and his illustrious son Aditya II, which describe reforms carried out professionally at universities, councils, military and navy. Parantaka was well supported by his management councillors. Thus we know from an inscription of his how a certain aniruddha brahmarayan who was a follower of jaiminiya sutra of samaveda(jaiminiya sutrattu aniruddha bhramarayar) and who was a "servitor at the feet of lord of river girt arankam(srirangam),i.e lord vishnu", who belonged to royal council being felicitated for selfless service.

One of his queens, Vanavanmahadevi, a princess from the clan of Malaiyaman, committed sati at the king's death and her image was perhaps installed at the Thanjavur Temple by her daughter Kundavai. Another queen, a Chera princess survived him until 1001 CE.

During Parantaka II's reign, literature both Sanskrit and Tamil received encouragement. The Buddhist work on Tamil grammar, Virasoliyam eulogises him as a patron of letters and of Buddhism. The eulogy furnishes evidence for the friendly relationship between the Chola monarchs and the Buddhists.

Inscriptions 
The following is an inscription of Parantaka II from the Sivayoginathar Temple in Thiruvisanallur,

The term foremost in the family of the king Pirantaka's daughter indicates the alliance between the Chola and Irukkuvel families and the chief Siriyavela might have been the King's son-in-law or his daughter's father-in-law.

Here is another inscription of Parantaka II from the Vedapureeswarar temple in Tiruverkadu (north wall of the central shrine),

In popular culture 

 Sundara Chola, forms a main character in Kalki Krishnamurthy’s 1955 historical fiction novel Ponniyin Selvan. In his story, Kalki imagines Parantaka II to be a powerless ruler - handicapped by a debilitating illness. He is caught between opposing forces of his love for his children and his dependence on powerful courtiers.
 Indian actor Prakash Raj plays his role in Mani Ratnam's 2022 film Ponniyin Selvan: I which is based on Kalki's novel.

Notes

References 
 Nilakanta Sastri, K. A. (1935). The CōĻas, University of Madras, Madras (Reprinted 1984).
 Nilakanta Sastri, K. A. (1955). A History of South India, OUP, New Delhi (Reprinted 2002).
 Early Chola temples: Parantaka I to Rajaraja I, A.D. 907-985 By S. R. Balasubrahmanyam
 Journal of Indian museums, Volumes 14-16 By Museums Association of India
 A Topographical List of Inscriptions in the Tamil Nadu and Kerala States: Nilgiris District, Pudukkottai District, Ramanathapuram District, Salem District By T. V. Mahalingam 

Chola kings
970s deaths
Year of birth uncertain
10th-century Indian monarchs
10th-century Hindus